Ceanothus confusus is a species of shrub in the family Rhamnaceae known by the common name Rincon Ridge ceanothus. It is endemic to northern California where it grows in the coastal mountains north of the San Francisco Bay Area. Its habitats include coniferous forest, woodland, and chaparral. This is a low, spreading shrub often forming a short mat up to about 1.2 meters wide. The stem is gray-brown with new twigs having a reddish color and fuzzy texture. The evergreen leaves are oppositely arranged. Each is up to 2 centimeters long and oval in shape with 3 to 5 large teeth. The upper surface is shiny green and the underside is paler and feltlike in texture with hairs along the veins. The inflorescence is a small cluster of blue or purple flowers. The fruit is a horned capsule about half a centimeter wide.

References

External links
Calflora Database: Ceanothus confusus (Rincon ridge ceanothus)
Jepson Manual Treatment of Ceanothus confusus
USDA Plants Profile for Ceanothus confusus (Rincon ridge ceanothus)
 California Native Plant Society, Milo Baker Chapter: "Rincon Ridge Park Sensitive Plant Area" — Ceanothus confusus habitat.
UC Photos gallery of Ceanothus confusus

confusus
Endemic flora of California
Natural history of the California chaparral and woodlands
Natural history of the California Coast Ranges
~
Natural history of Lake County, California
Natural history of Napa County, California
Natural history of Sonoma County, California
Endemic flora of the San Francisco Bay Area
Plants described in 1939
Taxa named by John Thomas Howell
Critically endangered flora of California